Anthony D. Asher (born May 2, 1939) is an American songwriter and advertising copywriter who is best known for his collaborations with Brian Wilson (of the Beach Boys) and Roger Nichols in the 1960s. Asher co-wrote eight songs on the Beach Boys' 1966 album Pet Sounds, including the singles "God Only Knows", "Wouldn't It Be Nice", and "Caroline, No". According to Asher, he mainly served as a lyricist for Wilson's songs, but in some cases also contributed musical ideas. Asher also composed jingles, such as Mattel's slogan "You can tell it's Mattel—it's swell!", and contributed songs to The Partridge Family.

Background
Tony Asher was born in London on May 2, 1939, the son of American actress Laura La Plante and film producer Irving Asher. He and his mother moved to Los Angeles before he was six months old, while Irving remained in England to serve in the US Army during World War II. As a child, Asher played piano and composed. He graduated from UCLA with a degree in journalism and subsequently found employment at the Carson/Roberts/Inc. advertising agency. Asher devised the company's Mattel slogan, "You can tell it's Mattel—it's swell!", a success that led him to write popular ads and jingles for Barbie and Chatty Cathy dolls. His colleagues at the agency included Terry Gilliam and Joel Siegel. Asher also collaborated on songwriting with Van Dyke Parks.

Pet Sounds

Meeting Wilson

According to most sources, Asher met Brian Wilson while recording at United Western Recorders in 1965. Asher was a 26-year-old copywriter who had been working on advertising jingles and had felt that the Beach Boys were distinct from most artists, releasing a string of hits where "you wouldn't even know, necessarily, that it was gonna be a Beach Boys record from the first bar or something." However, although he was a fan, he "didn't own any of their albums. I had Bill Evans albums."

Asher explained, "I think we were recording some music, or voice-overs for a commercial and I had heard that the Beach Boys were in another studio. During a break, we kind of hung out in the hallway and eventually, sort of snuck into the booth and Brian was in the studio [alone]. ... eventually, we met." Looking for a clean break from the by-then-famous Beach Boys sound (associated with surfing and cars) and not wanting to collaborate with any of the songwriters with whom he had previously worked, Wilson called Asher around December 1965, and within ten days they started to write the songs that formed the bulk of Pet Sounds.

Other sources state that the pair had met during a social gathering at mutual friend Loren Schwartz's house. Asher said that Schwartz "had been a classmate of mine at Santa Monica College. ... Occasionally I would see Brian [at Loren's house]—but [Brian] never stayed long." Wilson biographer Peter Ames Carlin dates the initial meeting between Asher and Wilson to early 1963. Schwartz himself claimed that he was introduced to Wilson by Asher, "my best pal in college," at Western Studio. Asked why he felt Asher was the right collaborator, Wilson responded that he "thought he was a cool person" and was impressed that Asher had known Schwartz, "a very brainy guy, a real verbal type person."

Collaboration
Wilson and Asher wrote together for about three weeks. According to Asher, a typical writing session started either with Wilson's playing melody or chord patterns that he was working on, by discussing a recent record that Wilson liked the feel of, or by discussing a subject that Wilson had always wanted to write a song about. Asher's contribution to the music itself was minimal, serving mainly as a source of second opinion for Wilson as he worked out possible melodies and chord progressions, although the two did trade ideas as the songs evolved. He characterized the experience as "writing an autobiography", however, "I wouldn't limit it to Brian's autobiography." On "God Only Knows", Wilson reflected, "I think Tony had a musical influence on me [through his] certain love for classic songs." In turn, Asher admired the way Wilson "hunt[ed] for a chord change ... the [same] way some of us type."

Asher contended that his most significant musical contributions were to "I Just Wasn't Made for These Times", "Caroline, No", and "That's Not Me".  He also said that he conceived the title and subject matter to three of their eight songs. On the publishing royalties, Asher agreed to a 25% cut, an arrangement that he felt was not necessarily commensurate with his contributions. In his words, it was "a screw ... Until you consider that I was a nothing who had never done shit, and I had a chance to write with a guy who had something like nine million-selling records in a row. Well, then it doesn’t seem so bad."

In later years, Asher reflected on his interactions with Wilson and his bandmates as an "embarrassing" experience. He remembered that Wilson "exhibit[ed] this awful taste. His choice of movies, say, was invariably terrible. ... every four hours we'd spend writing songs, there'd be about 48 hours of these dopey conversations about some dumb book [about mysticism] he'd just read. Or else he'd just go on and on about girls." He added that his impression of Wilson was of "the single most irresponsible person" he had ever met, recalling that he had seen uncashed royalty checks of up to $100,000 laying around Wilson's house. He was further bemused by what he described as "the weird relationship he maintained with Marilyn ... like something out of The Flintstones. Personally, I could never understand why he'd married her."

Asked if Wilson had displayed any signs of "lunacy", Asher responded that Wilson had "fits of this uncontrollable anger. Then he'd fall apart and start crying during play-backs of certain tracks." Asher believed that the "whole claustrophobic scene with him and his family" was more to blame for Wilson's bipolar moods than his use of LSD. Asher later called Wilson a "genius musician but an amateur human being". Referencing this remark in a 2013 interview, Asher said that he "didn’t mean that in the way it came out", explaining, "We all have areas of things we’re good at and things we’re not so good at, but his is so zeroed-in on music."

After their songs were completed, Asher visited a few of the recording sessions, most of which were string overdub dates. He did not have a favorable reaction when he learned of the album's title. He remembered that Wilson showed him "some proofs of the pictures they'd done at the zoo, and he told me they were thinking of calling the album Pet Sounds. I thought it was a goofy name for an album – I thought it trivialized what we had accomplished. On the other hand, I was aware that many of Brian's off-the-wall ideas had turned out to be brilliant." Asher was not called again to write for the next Beach Boys album. He said, "I wasn't surprised. Remember, Pet Sounds was considered a flop. Even before the songs were recorded, I knew that the rest of the band felt that Brian's decision to write with me was a bad decision."

Later career

In the late 1990s, Wilson and Asher rekindled their writing partnership and wrote at least four songs together. Only two were released: "This Isn't Love" and "Everything I Need". A piano-only rendition of "This Isn't Love" was issued on the 1997 compilation Songs Without Words, while a full-band live performance was released on Wilson's 2002 album Live at the Roxy Theatre. In 1997, "Everything I Need" appeared on The Wilsons, a project involving Wilson and his daughters Carnie and Wendy.

References

Further reading

External links
 

American lyricists
Living people
1939 births
Jingle writers
Musicians from Los Angeles